Transmountain railroads are railroads that need to cross dauntingly high mountain ranges to cross between countries on one side to the other. The Himalayan Mountains, Andes and the Alps would be cases in point. Because of construction difficulties, some such railways are yet to be built. With globalisation and trade liberalisation, the economic viability of constructing of these railways is improving.

Myanmar to China
In 2009, a railway was proposed to link Lashio, Myanmar and Jiegao, China and which also crosses the Himalaya Mountains.

Pakistan to China

The proposed trans-Himalayan railway from Pakistan to China via the Khunjerab Pass could count as a transcontinental railroad due to the size of the mountains in the way.

See also

 Mountain railway
 List of railroad crossings of the North American continental divide
 Principal passes of the Alps
 Qinghai–Tibet Railway
 Trans-Andean railways
 Trans-Asian Railway
 Transcontinental railroad

References

Mountain railways
International rail transport